Edmund Piers Barclay (2 May 1898 – 26 August 1961) was an English-Australian writer known for his work in radio drama. Radio historian Richard Lane called him "Australian radio's first great writer and, many would say, Australian radio's greatest playwright ever."

Biography
Barclay claimed to have been born on 2 May 1898 at Dinapore, India, the son of Major Edmund Compston-Buckleigh, from Middlesex, England. He also maintained that he was educated at Stonyhurst College, joined the Middlesex Regiment on 11 August 1914, and won the Military Cross and Croix de Guerre while serving with the Royal Flying Corps. However, there is no record of anyone with the surname Barclay or Compston-Buckleigh having attended Stonyhurst or served with the Royal Flying Corps. He claimed that after WWI he worked as a journalist in Fleet Street, London, until sacked for costing his employers £2000 in a libel suit; he then reputedly ran his own short-lived, weekly newspaper.

Arriving in Australia in August 1926, he was determined to show the world that "he was the world's greatest novelist". He worked as a journalist, wrote film scripts (The Silence of Dean Maitland, 1934), short stories, plays, newspaper articles and verse. On 17 December 1933 he was employed by the Australian Broadcasting Commission as a dramatist. The first radio play Barclay wrote was An Antarctic Epic. Barclay wrote very little for the stage. In 1934 he collaborated with Varney Monk  as composer to write The Cedar Tree, a musical romance produced by F. W. Thring in Melbourne. Barclay's wife Helene was the lyricist.

Family
His relationship with his wife Helene, who wrote plays for the ABC, was desperately unhappy. Survived by his daughter and son, Barclay died of a coronary occlusion on 26 August 1961 at Gosford, New South Wales. He was interred in Point Clare cemetery with Catholic rites.

Selected credits
The Three Musketeers (1934) - radio version of the famous story
Return of the Three Musketeers (1934) - radio play
An Antarctic Epic : The Story of Captain Scott's Tragic Journey to the South Pole (1934) - radio play
The Silence of Dean Maitland (1934) - co-screenplay
The Cedar Tree (1935) - book of musical
Lawrence of Arabia (1935) - radio play
Khyber (1935) - radio play - starred James Raglan
 A Cavalcade of Australian History (1935) - radio play
Khyber and Beyond (1936) - radio play, sequel to Khyber
Khyber (1936) - novel, based on his 1935 radio play
Shanghai (1936) - radio play
Dead or Alive (1936) - radio play
Lovers and Luggers (1937) - co-screenplay
Shanghai (1937) - novel, based on his radio play
Murder in the Silo (1937) - radio play
Neath Southern Skies (1938) - radio play
 As Ye Sow : An Australian Saga (1937–38) - radio play
Into the Light (1938) - radio play
The Girl with the Tattered Glove (1938) - radio play
Singapore Spy (1939) - radio play
Valley of the Sky (1939) - radio play
Madame Curie (1939) - radio play - starred Peter Finch
With Wings as Eagles (1943) - radio play (co-written with Joy Hollyer) 
The Bolero Murder (1940s) - radio play
The Man Who Liked Eclairs (1940s) - radio play
The Fortunes of Richard Mahony (1950) radio play, adapting the novel

References

External links

Edmund Barclay profile at the National Library of Australia 
Edmund Barclay Australian theatre credits at Ausstage
Edmund Barclay at Austlit (subscription required)
Edmund Barclay papers at the State Library of New South Wales

1898 births
1961 deaths
Australian radio producers
Australian radio writers
Australian screenwriters
20th-century Australian screenwriters
British people in colonial India
British emigrants to Australia